La Serra d'en Galceran is a small municipality in the province of Castelló, Valencian Community, Spain. It is located inland surrounded by the mountain range known as Serra d'en Galceran. The town gives its name to the range.

La Serra d'en Galceran is located about 50 km north of the town of Castelló de la Plana, on the north of the Valencian Community.

History
It is not known what was the name of the range or the village in ancient times. There are ancient Iberian settlements in an area known as El Castellàs, as well as some cave paintings that have been declared a World Heritage Site by UNESCO. During the Muslim times there was a castle, as well as some agricultural settlements, in the area.

Historically the first documents are from the years 1213 and 1238 and they tell that James I of Aragon gave the territory, just conquered from the saracens, to nobleman Pere Valimanya. Thus, in 1364 the place appears with the name Serra de Valimanya. Following this, the territory was acquired by a nobleman of the Galceran family; hence the present name.

Nicolau de Casalduch, known as "l'antic" or "el vinculador" gave the municipal charter to the town on 6 December 1512.

Villages 
 La Serra d'en Galceran
 El Brusalet
 Les Deveses
 Els Ivarsos
 La Marina
Els Rosildos
 Collet
 Els Bancals
Pujols de Dalt

References

External links

 La Serra d'en Galceran Town Hall official webpage
 Institut Valencià d'Estadística
Portal de la Direcció General d'Administració Local de la Generalitat

Plana Alta
Municipalities in the Province of Castellón